Kiss the Girls is a Greek film produced by Finos Film in 1965. It is written and directed by Giannis Dalianidis.

The lead Rena (Rena Vlachopoulou), a manager at a Greek tourist office in New York City, goes to Greece with her cousin Jeny (Zoi Laskari).

This is the first movie produced and projected with a stereo sound system in Greece, at the Attikon cinema. Attikon was the only theater that could play the movie with stereophonic sound.

The movie sold 619,236 tickets in Greece.

Cast

Zoi Laskari as Jeny
Rena Vlachopoulou as Rena Eleftheriou
Martha Karagianni as Martha
Chloi Liaskou as Efi Ramoglou
Kostas Voutsas as Kostas Kaliakoudas
Andreas Douzos as Andreas Ramoglou
Giannis Vogiatzis as Jim Pappas
Alekos Tzanetakos as Alekos Grigoriadis
Giorgos Gavriilidis as Petros Ramoglou
Periklis Christoforidis as Giorgos Eleftheriou
Giorgos Vrasivanopoulos as Paul
Angelos Mavropoulos as the judge

References

External links
Kiss the Girls at Finos Films

1965 films
1960s Greek-language films
1965 musical films
Finos Film films
Films shot in Rhodes
Greek musical films
Films directed by Giannis Dalianidis